is a football (soccer) club based in Bunkyō, which is located in Tokyo in Japan. They play in the Kantō Soccer League, which is part of Japanese Regional Leagues. It is the reserve team of Tokyo Musashino United, who plays at the Japan Football League.

History
In January 2015, Keio University Soccer Team - playing in Tokyo Metropolitan Football League - decided to merge with Tokyo University Association Football Club, the football team of University of Tokyo. The will of this new reality is to reach J. League by 2020.

After getting the club to Division 1 of Kantō Soccer League, the club changed their name to Tokyo United Football Club in 2016. They also featured a female team, Bunkyo LB Ladies.

League record

Key
Pos. = Position in league; GP = Games played; W = Games won; D = Games drawn; L = Games lost; F = Goals scored; A = Goals conceded; GD = Goals difference; Pts = Points gained

Current squad
Updated to August 11th, 2022.

References

External links
Official Site 
Official Facebook Page
Official Twitter Account

Football clubs in Japan
Football clubs in Tokyo
Association football clubs established in 2015
2015 establishments in Japan